The 2022 World Aesthetic Group Gymnastics Championships, the 22nd edition of the Aesthetic group gymnastics competition, was held in Graz, Austria from November 25 to 27, at the Raiffeisen Sportpark.

Participating countries

Medal winners

Medal table

References

External links
Official page
IFAGG Event site 

World Aesthetic Gymnastics Championships
2022 in Austrian sport
2022 in gymnastics
Gymnastics competitions in Austria
International sports competitions hosted by Austria
World Aesthetic Gymnastics Championships